Texas Tech University College of Education is a college at Texas Tech University in Lubbock, Texas. The education program has existed at Texas Tech University since 1925. The college is accredited by the National Council for Accreditation of Teacher Education.

Academic departments 
 Curriculum and Instruction
 Educational Psychology, Leadership and Counseling
 Special Education
 Teacher Education

Research centers 
 Academy for Teacher Induction Support and Assistance
 Burkhart Center for Autism Education and Research
 Center for the Integration of Science Education and Research
 Virginia Murray Sowell Center for Research and Education in Visual Impairment

Notable people

Alumni

Faculty

Gallery

References

External links
 

Schools of education in Texas
Educational institutions established in 1925
Education
1925 establishments in Texas